Johannes Molzahn (Duisburg, 21 May 1892–Munich, 31 December 1965) was a German artist.

Biography
Johannes Ernst Ludwig Molzahn was born 21 May 1892 in Duisburg. He learned drawing and photography, but later concentrated on painting. 1908-1914 he stayed in Switzerland. Molzahn became acquainted with Herwarth Walden, Walter Gropius, Theo van Doesburg and El Lissitzky. He was a member of the Arbeitsrat für Kunst. After World War I he worked as a graphic designer and through intervention of Bruno Taut became a graphics teacher in Magdeburg. He was forbidden to work by the Nazis in 1933 and fired. Eight of his works were shown in the exhibition of entartete Kunst in 1937.

He emigrated to the United States in 1938 and returned to Germany 1959, settling in Munich. He died there 31 December 1965.

Notes and references

External links
 Works by Johannes Molzahn at MoMA

1892 births
1965 deaths
Abstract painters
German draughtsmen
Photographers from North Rhine-Westphalia
20th-century German painters
20th-century German male artists
German male painters
Modern painters
People from Duisburg